The Isaac Ziegler House was a historic home once located at 712 North 4th Avenue in Knoxville, Tennessee.  Designed by prominent Knoxville catalog architect George Franklin Barber, it was listed on the National Register of Historic Places, and described as the most ornate Queen Anne-Romanesque house in Tennessee.

History

The house was built in 1892.  Demographic changes in Knoxville's inner city neighborhoods and the construction of the Magnolia Expressway across the street from the house contributed to the neglect and deterioration of the once impressive house.  It was finally demolished by the city.

See also
List of George Franklin Barber works

References

Sources
 Knoxville: Fifty Landmarks. (Knoxville: The Knoxville Heritage Committee of the Junior League of Knoxville, 1976).
 Barber, George F.  Victorian Cottage Architecture: An American Catalog of Designs, 1891. (Dover, 2004)
 Barber, George F. The Cottage Souvenir: Containing over two hundred original designs and plans of artistic dwellings. (S.B. Newman & Co; Rev. edition, 1892).
 Barber, George F. The Cottage Souvenir No. 2: Containing one hundred and twenty original designs in cottage and detail architecture. (S.B. Newman & Co., 1891).
 Barber, George F.  Art in Architecture,: With the modern architectural designer for those who wish to build or beautify their homes. (S.B. Newman; 2d ed edition, 1902).

External links

 Institute For Small Town Studies Barber Exhibit
 Historic Salisbury Barber House Restoration

Houses in Knoxville, Tennessee
Former National Register of Historic Places in Tennessee
Historic American Buildings Survey in Tennessee
Houses on the National Register of Historic Places in Tennessee
Queen Anne architecture in Tennessee
Houses completed in 1892
National Register of Historic Places in Knoxville, Tennessee